Bohdan Urbankowski (born 19 May 1943 in Warsaw) is a Polish writer, poet and philosopher.

An opposition activist in People's Republic of Poland, he received several awards for his publications, most of which were published underground (bibuła).

The author of over 40 books, including many biographies including those of Adam Mickiewicz, Józef Piłsudski and John Paul II.

Selected works
Dostojewski - dramat humanizmów. 1978
Czerwona msza, albo usmiech Stalina (the red Mass, or Stalin’s smile). 1995, 2011
Józef Piłsudski: marzyciel i strateg (Józef Piłsudski: Dreamer and Strategist). 1997
Trzema drogami nadziei Opowieść o wędrówkach Karola Wojtyły. 2002
Poeta, czyli człowiek zwielokrotniony. Szkice o Zbigniewie Herbercie. 2004

References
 Longer bio
 Short bio and some poems
 Short bio

1943 births
Living people
20th-century Polish poets
20th-century Polish philosophers
21st-century Polish philosophers
20th-century Polish dramatists and playwrights
Polish male dramatists and playwrights
Polish male poets
21st-century Polish poets
21st-century Polish dramatists and playwrights
20th-century Polish male writers
21st-century Polish male writers
Recipient of the Meritorious Activist of Culture badge